Sant'Agostino is a Gothic-Romanesque style Roman Catholic church in Gubbio, region of Umbria, Italy.

A church at the site was built in the second half of the 13th century. Among the works inside are
Jesus and the Samaritan (1580), by Virgilio Nucci (first chapel on left)
Madonna del Soccorso, 15th century (5th chapel on left)
Madonna di Grazia, fresco attributed to Ottaviano Nelli (3rd chapel right)
Baptism of St Augustine (1594), di Felice Damiani (4th chapel right) 
Last Judgement fresco in Arch, by Jacopo Salimbeni of San Severino Marche and studio of Ottaviano Nelli
Story of St Augustine (1420) in the apse, studio of Ottaviano Nelli

References

Agostino
Gothic architecture in Gubbio
13th-century Roman Catholic church buildings in Italy